Disney Entertainment is one of the three major business segments of The Walt Disney Company, consisting of Disney's entertainment media and content businesses, including its motion picture film studios, television content production and distribution, streaming services, and overseas media businesses. As part of the segment's formation on February 8, 2023, Disney Media and Entertainment Distribution (DMED) was dissolved and consolidated into the Disney Entertainment unit.

Background 
On November 20, 2022, The Walt Disney Company announced the return of Bob Iger as CEO of the company, following the unscheduled and immediate dismissal of his appointed successor, Bob Chapek. The next day, on November 21, Iger announced that Kareem Daniel would be stepping down as chairman of Disney Media and Entertainment Distribution (DMED), and that DMED would be later reorganized into a new unit with Dana Walden, Alan Bergman, James Pitaro, and Christine McCarthy being involved in the creation of the new unit. Iger reasoned that the move was intended to return "more decision-making back in the hands of our creative teams and rationalizes costs".

On February 8, 2023, Disney announced a corporate restructuring that included the establishment of Disney Entertainment, with Bergman and Walden serving as co-chairman. All the divisions of the Walt Disney Studios and Disney General Entertainment, as well as Disney Streaming, Disney Platform Distribution, advertising and international operations were folded into the new segment.

On February 9, it was announced that Rebecca Campbell, chairman of International Content and Operations, would be leaving her position. Later that month, Walden reorganized the television divisions in a structure that places National Geographic and Onyx Collective under FX Networks chairman John Landgraf; and combines Freeform and ABC Entertainment.

Leadership 

 Alan Bergman, Co-Chairman
 Dana Walden, Co-Chairman
 Justin Connolly, President, Disney Platform Distribution
 Rita Ferro, President, Disney Advertising
 Luke Kang, President, Asia Pacific
 Jan Koeppen, President, EMEA
 Aaron LaBerge, Chief Technology Officer
 Diego Lerner, President, The Walt Disney Company Latin America
 K Madhavan, President, The Walt Disney Company India
 Michael Paull, President, Disney Streaming
 Alisa Bowen, President, Disney+
 Joe Earley, President, Hulu

Units

Walt Disney Studios

Walt Disney Studios Motion Pictures

Disney Theatrical Group

Disney Music Group

Disney Studio Services

Disney General Entertainment Content

A&E Networks 
50% equity holding; joint venture with Hearst Corporation

Disney Streaming

Disney Platform Distribution

International Network Brands

References

External links 

2022 establishments in the United States
The Walt Disney Company divisions
Entertainment companies established in the 2020s
Entertainment companies based in California
Companies based in Burbank, California
Entertainment companies established in 2023
2023 establishments in California